Maderas Volcano Natural Reserve is a nature reserve in Nicaragua, was declared which published in the official newspaper La Gaceta No. 213 of September 9, 1993. It is one of the 78 reserves that are under official protection in the country.

References

Protected areas of Nicaragua